Stay with Me is a 2010 Canadian drama film, directed by Robert Ménard. An ensemble cast drama described by its director as a "choral" film, it tells five interrelated stories about various residents of Montreal who are struggling with their interpersonal relationships.

Florian (Vincent Bilodeau) and Maggie (Danielle Proulx), are a couple whose relationship is tested by Maggie's struggle with alcoholism. Simon (Louis Morissette) and Sophie (Maxim Roy) are a young couple whose joy at Sophie's first pregnancy turns to conflict when medical testing reveals that the baby has Down syndrome. Laurie (Julie Perreault) is the single mother of Ariane (Alexandra Sicard), who is drawn into a fight with the girl's father after she turns out to be allergic to the new kitten he bought her as a gift. Wilfrid Martin (Gérard Poirier) is a lonely older man struggling to cope with the recent death of his wife. Youssef (Joseph Antaki) and Fatima (Fariba Bonakdar) are an immigrant couple coping with the difficulties of adjusting to a new country.

The film premiered on October 30, 2010 at the Abitibi-Témiscamingue International Film Festival before opening commercially on November 5.

The film received three Jutra Award nominations at the 13th Jutra Awards in 2011, for Best Supporting Actor (Poirier), Best Supporting Actress (Proulx) and Best Original Music (Michel Cusson).

References

External links

2010 films
Canadian drama films
Films shot in Quebec
Films set in Quebec
Films directed by Robert Ménard
French-language Canadian films
2010s Canadian films